Okla is an abbreviation of the U.S. state of Oklahoma.

It can also refer to:

 Okla, Saskatchewan, an organized hamlet in Saskatchewan, Canada
 Okla, Hitchiti language for Tribal town